Sphericity is a measure of how closely the shape of an object resembles that of a perfect sphere. For example, the sphericity of the balls inside a ball bearing determines the quality of the bearing, such as the load it can bear or the speed at which it can turn without failing. Sphericity is a specific example of a compactness measure of a shape.  Defined by Wadell in 1935, the sphericity, of a particle is the ratio of the surface area of a sphere with the same volume as the given particle to the surface area of the particle:

The sphericity of a sphere is unity by definition and, by the isoperimetric inequality, any particle which is not a sphere will have sphericity less than 1.

Sphericity applies in three dimensions; its analogue in two dimensions, such as the cross sectional circles along a cylindrical object such as a shaft, is called roundness.

Ellipsoidal objects 

The sphericity, of an oblate spheroid (similar to the shape of the planet Earth) is:

 

where a and b are the semi-major and semi-minor axes respectively.

Derivation 

Hakon Wadell defined sphericity as the surface area of a 
sphere of the same volume as the particle divided by the actual surface area of the particle. 

First we need to write surface area of the sphere,  in terms of the volume of the particle, 

therefore

hence we define  as:

Sphericity of common objects

See also 
Equivalent spherical diameter
Flattening
Index of sphericity
Isoperimetric ratio
Rounding (sediment)
Roundness
Willmore energy

References

External links 

Grain Morphology: Roundness, Surface Features, and Sphericity of Grains

Geometric measurement
Spheres
Metrology